Theriaca may refer to:

Theriaca (poem) by Nicander of Colophon, Greek poet of 2nd century BC
Theriaca or Theriac, ancient Greek remedy
Venice treacle, also called Andromachi theriaca, antidote against venom

See also
Treacle